Plyoso is a rural locality (a village) in Rochegodskoye Rural Settlement of Vinogradovsky District, Arkhangelsk Oblast, Russia. The population was 9 as of 2010.

Geography 
Plyoso is located 39 km southeast of Bereznik (the district's administrative centre) by road. Filippovskaya is the nearest rural locality.

References 

Rural localities in Vinogradovsky District